The Lionel toy stores (doing business as Lionel Kiddie City, Lionel Playworld, and, until 1990, Lionel Toy Warehouse) were American toy store chains under the ownership of Lionel Corp.

History
Kiddie City Toy Stores were started in the 1960s.  By the early 1980s, Lionel operated 150 stores, under the names Lionel Kiddie City, Lionel Playworld, and Lionel Toy Warehouse (rebranded as Lionel Kiddie City in 1990). For a time it was the second-largest toy store chain in the United States. Lionel ran into financial trouble during the early 1980s recession and filed for Chapter 11 bankruptcy in February 1982. After reducing itself in size to 55 stores, it emerged from bankruptcy in September 1985.

By 1991, the chain grew to 100 stores and was the fourth-largest toy retailer in the country, but once again ran into trouble due to a combination of factors. In 1989 Robert I. Toussie L.P., a partnership of several retail executives, attempted to buy the company. Lionel resisted, and the fight drained the company of cash. Meanwhile, non-specialty discount stores expanded their toy sections and undercut the prices of specialty toy chains. Additionally, Lionel found it difficult to compete on price with the larger Toys "R" Us, and the chain attempted to expand too rapidly in a weakened economy. After several successive unprofitable quarters, it filed for Chapter 11 bankruptcy on June 14, 1991. In 1992 Lionel attempted to reverse its fortunes by merging with the bankrupt Child World, the United States' #3 toy retailer, but was unable to secure financing. By February 1993 Lionel had closed all but 29 stores in six states, concentrating on the markets of Philadelphia, central New Jersey, Baltimore, Washington, D.C., Cleveland, Ohio and south Florida. Unable to reach an agreement for reorganization with its creditors, on June 2, Lionel announced its intention to liquidate all of its stores and go out of business.

The Lionel trademarks were purchased by Richard Kughn, a real estate magnate who had bought the Lionel model train line from General Mills in 1986.

Slogans
 Shop Lionel (Kiddie City/Playworld), toy capital of the world!
 Let Lionel (Kiddie City/Playworld) turn that frown… upside down!
 Playworld, A World of Toys. Great for Girls, and Great for Boys. Playworld, Where Prices Go, So Low, Low, Low, Low, Low. (NY stores)

References 

Defunct toy manufacturers
Defunct companies based in New Jersey
Companies based in New Jersey
Lionel, LLC
Retail companies established in 1969
Retail companies disestablished in 1993
Companies that filed for Chapter 11 bankruptcy in 1982
Companies that filed for Chapter 11 bankruptcy in 1991
Companies that have filed for Chapter 7 bankruptcy
Toy retailers of the United States